The RB5X is a personal robot manufactured by RB Robot Corporation of Golden, Colorado.

A cylinder-shaped robot with an optional arm, and a transparent, dome-shaped top, RB5X has an RS-232 communications interface and is programmable in TinyBASIC or Savvy.  It was first released circa 1983. Its inputs include eight bumper panels, a photodiode and a sonic transducer. The robot learns from experience.
 
The RB5X was an early commercial implementation of the concept of autonomous mobile robotics (AMR)  proposed and demonstrated by author/ inventor, David L. Heiserman in 1976.

References

External links 
 https://www.nytimes.com/1984/01/12/garden/past-and-present-robots-gather-for-exhibition.html
 http://ww.theoldrobots.com/rb5x.html
 http://www.rbrobotics.com/

1983 robots
Robots of the United States
Rolling robots